Randolph D. "Randy" Brock III (born September 28, 1943) is an American politician from the state of Vermont and a member of the Republican Party. He currently serves in the Vermont Senate and is the first African American caucus leader in Vermont. He served as the Vermont Auditor of Accounts from 2005 to 2007, as a member of the Vermont Senate from 2009 to 2013 and was the Republican nominee for Governor of Vermont in 2012, losing to Democratic incumbent Peter Shumlin. He ran unopposed for the 2016 Republican nomination for Lieutenant Governor of Vermont. In December 2017, Governor Phil Scott announced that he had appointed Brock to the Vermont Senate, filling the vacancy caused by the resignation of Dustin Allard Degree.

Early and personal life
Brock was born in Philadelphia, Pennsylvania. He holds a B.A. from Middlebury College and an M.A. from Yale University.

Brock served in the United States Army, attaining the rank of captain. He saw action in the Vietnam War, earning a Bronze Star and an Army Commendation Medal.

He is a retired executive vice president for Fidelity Investments.

He is married to Andrea Forrest Brock, and the couple has two children.

State Auditor

2004 election
Brock was elected as Auditor in 2004, defeating Democratic incumbent Elizabeth M. Ready in her bid for re-re-election.

2006 election and recount

In the November 7, 2006 election, Brock was challenged by Democratic candidate Thomas M. Salmon, the son of former Vermont Governor Thomas P. Salmon. The initial vote tally put Brock ahead by 137 votes. However, Salmon requested a recount, and on December 21, 2006, Salmon was declared the winner by a margin of 102 votes.

State Senate
In 2008 Brock was elected to the Vermont State Senate. He was re-elected in 2010.

2012 gubernatorial election

On December 7, 2011, Brock announced his candidacy for Governor of Vermont in the 2012 gubernatorial election. He received the Republican nomination unopposed and ran against incumbent Democratic Governor Peter Shumlin. Brock, however, only received 37.7% of the vote; Shumlin was easily re-elected, with 170,598 votes to Brock's 110,940.

2016 Lieutenant Governor election
Brock ran unopposed for the 2016 Republican nomination for Lieutenant Governor of Vermont, and faced Senator David Zuckerman in the general election. He lost in the general election, receiving 139,344 votes to Zuckerman's 159,738.

Return to State Senate
In November 2017, Republican Dustin Allard Degree resigned from the Vermont Senate to accept a position as special assistant to Governor Phil Scott. In December, Scott interviewed three candidates recommended by the Franklin County Republican Party. On December 27, he announced that he had selected Brock to fill the vacancy. In November 2020, Brock was elected minority leader in the state senate. He is the first African American caucus leader in Vermont ever.

Political positions
Brock is viewed as a moderate-leaning Republican considering Vermont’s politically progressive reputation, but takes more conservative positions on certain issues. He opposes same-sex marriage, voting against legislation to legalize it in Vermont in 2009; although, during his 2012 gubernatorial campaign, he supported the Vermont Supreme Court’s decision to allow civil unions between same-sex couples. He is against gun-control legislation, voting against 2018 legislation that was signed by fellow Republican Governor Phil Scott that expanded background checks for gun buyers to include private firearms sales, set limits on the size of magazines for handguns and long guns, raised the minimum age to purchase a firearm in Vermont to 21, and banned bump stocks. However, he is pro-choice, supported Roe v. Wade, and opposes the prohibition of public funds for organizations that perform abortions.

According to Vote Smart’s 2020 election analysis of his positions, Brock supported pro-choice legislation, opposes marijuana legalization, opposes tax increases, supported voter identification requirements and automatic voter registration, opposed capital punishment and other tough-on-crime policies, supported government regulations of greenhouse gas emissions, supported government funding for development of renewable energy, opposes gun-control legislation, supports Medicaid expansion, supports the inclusion of gender identity and sexual orientation in anti-discrimination laws, supported both government spending and lowering state income taxes as a means of promoting economic growth, opposes raising the minimum wage, and supports state funding for charter schools.

References

External links
Official campaign website

|-

|-

|-

|-

1943 births
20th-century African-American people
21st-century African-American politicians
21st-century American politicians
African-American people in Vermont politics
African-American state legislators in Vermont
Living people
Middlebury College alumni
Military personnel from Philadelphia
Politicians from Philadelphia
State Auditors of Vermont
United States Army personnel of the Vietnam War
Republican Party Vermont state senators
Yale University alumni